Francis or Frances Clayton may refer to:

Frances Clayton, female Union soldier
Captain Francis Clayton of HMS Swinger (1872)
Francis Corder Clayton on List of Lord Mayors of Birmingham

See also
Frank Clayton (disambiguation)